Brogan Group is an international group of access companies operating in the UK, Ireland, Saudi Arabia and the UAE. The company was founded by James Brogan in the late 80s and is now among the largest specialist access companies within the countries it operates. With headquarters near London in the United Kingdom, offices in Dublin & Mayo in Ireland, Dubai in the UAE and Riyadh in Saudi Arabia. The companies services are supplied to the majority of the top companies in the construction industry which include scaffolding, construction hoists, common towers, mast climbers, crane decks and cradles. In April 2020, Brogan group won the Queen’s Award for Enterprise, business success.

Services
Brogan Group provide access to a range of construction projects, including airports, hospitals, schools, roads, office blocks, shopping centres, high rise apartments, bridges, railways, historic and listed buildings.

Major projects
Brogan Group have provided access for construction projects internationally:

  Battersea Power Station, London (ongoing)
 Museum of the Future, Dubai (Completed in 2019)
 Jumeirah Beach Hotel, Dubai (Completed in 2018, recipient of an RIBA National Award in 2019)
 20 Fenchurch Street, London (Completed in 2014)
 Capital Gate ‘Splash’, Dubai (Completed in 2010)
 Heathrow Terminal 5 (Completed in 2008)
 West Tower, (Liverpool completed in 2008)
 The Beetham Tower, Manchester (completed in 2007)
 Kileen Castle (completed in 2005)
 the Elm Park development (completed in 2004)
 The Regent’s Quarter re-development at Kings Cross (completed in 2002)
 Ha'penny Bridge (completed in 2001)
 Royal Opera House (completed in 2000)

References

Construction and civil engineering companies of the United Kingdom
Construction companies based in London
2008 establishments in England
British companies established in 2008
Construction and civil engineering companies established in 2008